Neil David Hancock (born 13 April 1976) is a cricketer currently playing for Unicorns and Devon.

Hancock made his List A debut for Devon in 1999 and is now the captain for the county, as well as playing for local side, Bovey Tracey. He has played 10 List A games for Devon in the C&G Trophy which including minor counties until 2006. Hancock also played 3 games for Somerset in 2004 (one List A and two Twenty20). His highest List A score came on his debut against Berkshire when he scored 113 not out; he was named man of the match.

In 2010, Hancock was selected as one of 21 players to form the first Unicorns squad to take part in the 2010 Clydesdale Bank 40 domestic limited overs competition against the regular first-class counties. The Unicorns were made up of 15 former county cricket professionals and 6 young cricketers looking to make it in the professional game.

Hancock was born and raised in Casino, New South Wales, Australia, but came to England in 1996 when he joined Torquay Cricket Club; he has since started a family, and has completed his residential qualifications allowing him to become an English cricketer.

References

External links
 
 

Unicorns cricketers
Devon cricketers
Somerset cricketers
English cricketers
1976 births
Living people
Devon cricket captains